Spartak Chernihiv is Ukrainian women's football club from Chernihiv, Ukraine established in early 2000.

Please, note, for the women's football club that in 2015–2016 played at amateur level (First League) and was named as Spartak ShVSM Chernihiv, see Yunist ShVSM.

History

Origine
The team was formed after 2000 and they produced player like Liudmyla Shmatko and that first entered the 2015 First League competition and in 2016 received a promotion to the Ukrainian Women's League of the Ukrainian Top League for the season 2017. After this great result Anastasia Ilyina, that also played for WFC Lehenda-ShVSM Chernihiv, was called in the Ukrainian Women's National Team.

Recently Time

The new club takes Yunist ShVSM in 2017 the club was relocated to Plysky and was renamed as Yednist Plysky. The fact of succession confirmed in interview Alyona Komanda on 25 August 2022. In 2018 the Yednist Plysky was merged with Lehenda-ShVSM Chernihiv as Yednist-ShVSM Plysky. The Lehenda's chairman Volodymyr Maherramov became a chairman of Yednist-ShVSM. In June 2020 Yednist-ShVSM Plysky informed the Ukrainian Association of Football that it ends its participations in competitions. The new club tooks its roots from Spartak Chernihiv.

Stadium and facilities
The team started in the Sports complex, Museum, 4. in Chernihiv. In 2016 the Spartak sports base in Chernihiv is at the center of a scandal, The scandalous organization FSTU continues to claim that the building belongs to them and thus the postal address of the building is not required, as they are not going to transfer the complex to the balance of the city council. at the same time, the above-mentioned organization cannot submit documents on the right of ownership. The team played in Tekstylschyk stadium in Lokomotiv stadium and also in the new modern Chernihiv Arena in Chernihiv, belong to FC Chernihiv.

Notable players

 Liudmyla Shmatko

 Tamila Khimich

League and cup history

{|class="wikitable"
|-bgcolor="#efefef"
! Season
! Div.
! Pos.
! Pl.
! W
! D
! L
! GS
! GA
! P
!Domestic Cup
!colspan=2|Europe
!Notes
|-
|-bgcolor=LightCyan
|align=center|2015-16
|align=center|Ukrainian Women's First League
|align=center|1
|align=center|
|align=center|
|align=center|
|align=center|
|align=center|
|align=center|
|align=center|
|align=center|
|align=center|
|align=center|
|align=center bgcolor=lightgreen|Promoted
|-bgcolor=White
|align=center|2016-17
|align=center|Ukrainian Women's League
|align=center|
|align=center|
|align=center|
|align=center|
|align=center|
|align=center|
|align=center|
|align=center|
|align=center|
|align=center|
|align=center|
|align=center|
|}

Honours
 Ukrainian Women's First League
 Winners (1): 2015-2016

See also
 FC Desna Chernihiv
 FC Desna-2 Chernihiv
 FC Desna-3 Chernihiv
 SDYuShOR Desna
 Yunist Chernihiv
 Lehenda Chernihiv

References

External links

 
Football clubs in Chernihiv
Football clubs in Chernihiv Oblast
2000 establishments in Ukraine